Beninese people in France consist of migrants from Benin and their descendants living and working in France.

History                                  
The first Beninese immigrants in France arrived in the 1970s and the 1980s. They came mostly from urban areas.
Today, the population has become more and more numerous, but a little less than those from the neighboring nation of Togo.

References                            

Society of France
 
African diaspora in France
Immigration to France by country of origin